Craig Lahiff (23 April 1947 – 2 February 2014) was an Australian film director. He grew up in the Adelaide suburb of Somerton Park and studied science at Adelaide University, then trained as a systems consultant before studying  arts in film at Flinders University. He began working in the film industry on crews for movies such as Sunday Too Far Away and The Fourth Wish.

After making a number of short films he directed Coda (1987) a TV movie about a serial killer. The following year he earned an AFI nomination for his feature debut Fever, which was not released to cinemas but sold widely on DVD and video and made a profit. 

Lahiff died on 2 February 2014. At the time of his death he was developing two film noirs with regular producer Helen Leake as part of a film noir trilogy started by Swerve, and a biopic of General Sir John Monash with frequent collaborator Louis Nowra. He had married in 1976 but the marriage was dissolved. He had twin sons, Sean and Daland.

Filmography

As director
Labyrinth (1979) – short
The Coming (1981) – short
Coda (1987)
Fever (1989)
Strangers (1991)
Ebbtide (1994)
Heaven's Burning (1997)
Black and White (2002)
Swerve (2011)

As producer
The Dreaming (1988)

References

External links
 

Australian film directors
University of Adelaide alumni
Flinders University alumni
People from Adelaide
1947 births
2014 deaths